Dr. Yashodhara Mishra (born 1951) is a Odia writer and poet. She is a professor of English who has published poems, several collections of short stories and novels. She was a fellow at the Indian Institute of Advanced Study.

Life
Mishra was born in Sambalpur in 1951. She is a poet and a professor of English who has published several collections of short stories and novels. She has worked in the Odia language, Hindi and English.

Mishra has garnered a number of awards including the Katha Prize Story award.

She is a fellow at the Indian Institute of Advanced Study where her research includes rituals and gender and the Women of Orissa.

Mishra won the Sahitya Akademi Award for Odia in 2020 for her book, Samudrakula Ghara.

Awards
 2020: Sahitya Akademi Award, for Samudrakula Ghara

References

External links 

1951 births
Living people
People from Sambalpur
Women writers from Odisha
Poets from Odisha
Odia-language writers
Odia-language poets
Odia short story writers
Indian women poets
Indian women short story writers
Indian women translators
Recipients of the Sahitya Akademi Award in Odia
Recipients of the Odisha Sahitya Akademi Award
20th-century Indian women writers
20th-century Indian poets
20th-century Indian translators
21st-century Indian women writers
20th-century Indian short story writers
21st-century Indian short story writers
21st-century Indian poets
21st-century Indian translators